Kids Street is an American pay television channel operated by Condista Networks aimed at the 3 to 7-year-old Latino market in the United States.

History
The channel launched on Comcast Xfinity systems on January 16, 2017.

The channel operates an evening/late night block aimed at older audiences called Family Central Explorer. All programming aired on Kids Street is offered in English with Spanish available as a secondary audio program. The channel was added to Charter Spectrum on June 30, 2020.

In September 2020, the channel changed its name from "Kids Central" to its current name of "Kids Street."

References

External links
Kids Street website
Family Central Explorer website

Children's television networks in the United States
Television networks in the United States
English-language television stations in the United States
Television channels and stations established in 2017
2017 establishments in the United States
Preschool education television networks